Beg is a rural locality (a settlement) in Muromtsevskoye Rural Settlement, Sudogodsky District, Vladimir Oblast, Russia. The population was 948 as of 2010. There are 7 streets.

Geography 
Beg is located 2 km southwest of Sudogda (the district's administrative centre) by road. Sudogda is the nearest rural locality.

References 

Rural localities in Sudogodsky District